The Polestar Precept is a 4-door electric concept car by Polestar, a subsidiary of Volvo Cars and Geely. The Precept was unveiled on February 25, 2020. Prior to precautionary cancellation due to the COVID-19 pandemic, the Precept was scheduled to debut at the 2020 Geneva Motor Show. Polestar later announced that the Precept will enter production in 2024 as the Polestar 5.

Design
The Precept has a wheelbase of 122 inches and lacks B-pillars. Its design focuses on sustainability, with the interior materials utilizing flax, recycled plastic bottles, and recycled cork vinyl; minimalism and athleticism are also focuses of the design.

Lidar is incorporated into the roof, and there is an additional sensor array called the "SmartZone" of dual radar and a high-definition video camera built into the front of the car in place of a grille. The side and rear-view mirrors have all been replaced with cameras. The Precept runs Google's Android Automotive operating system.

References

External links

Electric concept cars
Concept cars
Electric vehicles